Heungyang O clan was one of the Korean clans. Their Bon-gwan was in Goheung County, South Jeolla Province. According to the research in 2000, the number of Heungyang O clan was 1984. O Cheom came over from China to Silla during Jijeung of Silla’s reign in Silla.

See also 
 Korean clan names of foreign origin

References

External links 
 

 
Korean clan names of Chinese origin
O clans